Martha Vicinus (born November 20, 1939) is an American scholar of English literature and Women's studies. She serves as the Eliza M. Mosher Distinguished University Professor of English, Women's Studies, and History at the University of Michigan. Prior to coming to the University of Michigan, Vicinus was a faculty member in the English Department at Indiana University from 1968 to 1982. She has written several books about Victorian women as well as gender and sexuality. She earned a PhD from the University of Wisconsin in 1968.

She has been noted for drawing attention to the Victorian double standards that were applied to women and to the Victorian ideal of women without sexual desires. She has argued that society often defines sexuality through a male heterosexual perspective.

In addition to her career as a scholar, she has been active as an advocate of anti-war and LGBT causes.

Selected works

 Coeditor, with Caroline Eisner. Originality, Imitation, and Plagiarism: Teaching Writing in the Digital Age. Ann Arbor: University of Michigan Press, 2008. .
 Intimate Friends: Women Who Loved Women. Chicago: University of Chicago Press, 2004. .
 Editor. Lesbian Subjects: A Feminist Studies Reader. Bloomington: Indiana University Press, 1996. .
 Coeditor, with Martin Bauml Duberman and George Chauncey, Jr. Hidden from History: Reclaiming the Gay & Lesbian Past. New York: New American Library, 1989. .
 Coeditor, with Bea Nergaard, Ever Yours, Florence Nightingale: Selected Letters. Cambridge: Harvard University Press, 1989. .
 Independent Women: Work and Community for Single Women, 1850-1920. Chicago: University of Chicago Press, 1985. .
 The Ambiguities of Self-Help: Concerning the Life and Work of the Lancashire Dialect Writer Edwin Waugh. Littleborough: George Kelsall, 1984. .
 A Widening Sphere: Changing Roles of Victorian Women. London: Methuen, 1977. .
 Broadsides of the Industrial North. Newcastle upon Tyne: F. Graham, 1975. . 
 The Industrial Muse: A Study of Nineteenth-Century British Working-Class Literature. London: Croom Helm, 1974. .
 Editor. Suffer and Be Still: Women in the Victorian Age. Bloomington: Indiana University Press, 1972. Oxon: Routledge, 2013. .
 The Lowly Harp: A Study of 19th Century Working Class Poetry. Ph.D. thesis, University of Wisconsin-Madison, 1969.

References

1939 births
Living people
Northwestern University alumni
Johns Hopkins University alumni
University of Wisconsin–Madison alumni
Indiana University faculty
University of Michigan faculty
Women's studies academics
Writers from Michigan
Writers from Wisconsin
Historians of LGBT topics
American historians